The Seivers Brothers Ranchhouse and Barn, located about  southeast of Lind, Washington, is a historic farmstead, comprising a barn, built in 1905 by P. Barnum, and the ranchouse, completed in 1910 by the Seivers brothers and Ed Crumbley.

The property was listed on the National Register of Historic Places in 1979.

See also
 National Register of Historic Places listings in Washington

References

Farms on the National Register of Historic Places in Washington (state)
Infrastructure completed in 1905
Houses completed in 1905
National Register of Historic Places in Adams County, Washington
1905 establishments in Washington (state)